FC Hammamet (Football Club Hammamet نادي كرة القدم بالحمامات) is a Tunisian football club founded by Mahmoud Laadouz (known as Sami Laadouz)in 2001. Its ground is located in Hammamet. The club is currently competing in the Tunisian Ligue 2.

References

External links
 Official website
 Fédération Tunisienne de Football
 FC Hammamet in SoccerWay

Football clubs in Tunisia
Association football clubs established in 1978
1978 establishments in Tunisia
Hammamet, Tunisia